John VI served as Greek Patriarch of Alexandria between 1062 and 1100.

References

11th-century Patriarchs of Alexandria
Melkites in the Fatimid Caliphate